Belchamp was a rural district in Essex in England.  It was formed under the Local Government Act 1894 from that part of the Sudbury rural sanitary district which was in Essex (the rest going to form the Melford Rural District in West Suffolk).

The rural district contained the following parishes:
 Alphamstone
 Belchamp Otten
 Belchamp St Paul
 Belchamp Walter
 Borley
 Bulmer
 Bures
 Foxearth
 Gestingthorpe
 Great Henny
 Lamarsh
 Liston
 Little Henny
 Middleton
 North Wood
 Pentlow
 Twinstead
 Wickham St Paul

Originally, the rural district also contained part of the parish of Ballingdon, the rest of which was in West Suffolk. The Essex part of the parish was transferred to West Suffolk (and the borough of Sudbury) in 1896.

Belchamp rural district was abolished in 1934 under a County Review Order, and merged into the Halstead Rural District.

References
https://web.archive.org/web/20071001001721/http://www.visionofbritain.org.uk/relationships.jsp?u_id=10153281

Political history of Essex
Districts of England created by the Local Government Act 1894
Rural districts of England